Paul Christian Kruger Jr. (born February 15, 1986) is a former American football defensive end. He was drafted by the Baltimore Ravens in the second round of the 2009 NFL Draft. He played college football at Utah. He also played for the Cleveland Browns and New Orleans Saints.

Early years
Kruger was an All-conference and preseason All-America quarterback as a senior in 2003 at Timpanogos High School in Orem, Utah. He was the team captain and lettered all four years. Kruger was ranked in the top 30 quarterbacks nationally by Student Sports.

From 2005 to 2007, he served a two-year mission for the LDS church in the Kansas City area (The Missouri Independence Mission).

College career
After an all-conference sophomore season in 2008, he decided to forgo his final two years of college eligibility to enter the 2009 NFL Draft. He was a member of two undefeated teams: signed with the University of Utah Utes as a quarterback in 2004 and was a redshirt on the 12–0, Fiesta Bowl champion team. He started at right end for Utah's 2008 13–0, Sugar Bowl champion team.

Career statistics
Source:

Kruger redshirted his freshman year of 2004, after which he served a two-year mission in Kansas and Missouri for the Church of Jesus Christ of Latter-day Saints, returning to the football field in the fall of 2007.

In 2007, he was a Sporting News and Scout.com second-team Freshman All-American. He was also honorable mention All-Mountain West. Kruger played in all 13 games and started the last 11 at right end. His 63 tackles were the most among the league's freshman linemen and the second-best freshman total at any position and ranked fourth on the team. He also had 7.5 tackles for loss, three sacks, five pass breakups, three fumble recoveries, a forced fumble and an interception. Kruger helped lead a Utes’ defense that ranked 11th in the nation against the run (99.2 ypg) and 11th-overall in total defense (289.2 ypg).

Due to an off-field injury (see Personal section), he was held out of spring practices but returned to the field in the fall.

As a sophomore in 2008, he was a first-team All-Mountain West defensive lineman. Sports Illustrated and College Football News named him honorable mention All-American. He played and started in all 13 games at right end. He led Utah and ranked second in the conference in tackles for loss (16.5) and was third in the league in sacks (7.5). He had seven pass breakups, which ranked second on the team, as well as two forced fumbles. His 61 total tackles ranked fifth on the team. He had four sacks (all solo) against Utah State that tied the school record and was the best single-game total in the country. His five TFL in that same game was the second-best mark in school history. He intercepted a pass against BYU and returned it 30 yards.

Professional career
Kruger was considered a top defensive end prospect for the 2009 NFL Draft.

Baltimore Ravens

On April 25, 2009, Kruger was selected in the second round (57th overall pick) of the 2009 NFL Draft by the Baltimore Ravens.

On November 29, 2009, in a game against the Pittsburgh Steelers, Kruger intercepted a Dennis Dixon pass in overtime and returned it 22 yards to set the Ravens up for a game-winning 29-yard field goal by kicker Billy Cundiff.

During the 2010 offseason Kruger was looking to bulk up in order to make the move from linebacker to defensive end in Baltimore's 3–4 defense mostly because of the lack of playing time he saw at OLB.

2010 was a frustrating year for Kruger playing in a new position as a 3–4 DE, he only recorded one tackle, and one sack in very limited playing time, playing in just 11 games and no starts. He deflected two passes.

After a 2010 season in which he struggled to get playing time at defensive end, he was moved back to outside linebacker in the Ravens hybrid 3–4 defensive scheme in 2011. He saw much more action in 2011 playing as a situational pass rusher, coming in and replacing Ravens veteran linebacker Jarret Johnson for 3rd down passing situations. He managed to rack up 5.5 regular season sacks in his new role, along with 15 tackles. In addition to this, he also recorded a sack against New England Patriots quarterback Tom Brady in the AFC championship game. The Ravens would go on to lose this game 23–20.

During the 2012 season, Kruger would become a significant part of the Ravens defense. In Week 10, against the Oakland Raiders, Kruger deflected a pass and picked an interception in a 55–20 win.  During Week 16 against the New York Giants, he sacked quarterback Eli Manning in a 33–14 victory. During the Wild card round in the 2012 playoffs, he forced Indianapolis Colts quarterback Andrew Luck to fumble. The Ravens would win 24–9. In the Divisional Round against the Denver Broncos, he recovered a strip sack fumble by Terrell Suggs on quarterback Peyton Manning in which the Ravens would go on to win 38–35 in double overtime. In Super Bowl XLVII, he had two sacks on critical junctures of the game, forcing the 49ers to kick field goals. The Ravens went on to win this game 34–31, giving Kruger his first Super Bowl victory.

Cleveland Browns
Kruger signed with the Cleveland Browns to a five-year $40M contract on March 12, 2013. He was one of the starting outside linebackers on opening day and has started all 16 games in 2013 for the team, providing a much needed pass rush from the Browns team of the previous year with 4.5 recorded sacks. He finished the 2013 season with 47 total tackles and 4.5 sacks.

Kruger had his best career season in 2014 recording 11 sacks, 36 solo tackles and 17 assists. He had 4 forced fumbles with one fumble recovery and played in all 16 games, starting 15 of them. 

In 2015, Kruger's productivity slipped to 2.5 sacks, 16 solo tackles, and 11 assists. As in 2015, he played in all 16 games and started 15 of them. 

Kruger was released by the Browns on August 29, 2016, during the final week of the preseason.

New Orleans Saints
On August 31, 2016, Kruger was signed by the New Orleans Saints.

Career NFL statistics

Personal life
Kruger went through two serious childhood accidents. He lost a kidney and his spleen and almost died in his uncle's jeep accident at age 13. In college at Salt Lake City, Utah (January 29, 2008), a street stabbing left him with a collapsed lung and a 6.5-inch scar on his chest. A screwdriver was  driven through the back of a Ute teammate and brass knuckles were used to break the nose and shatter the cheekbone of his younger brother. The fight left Kruger with "life-threatening injuries" that required nearly 50 staples to close the incisions made during a four-hour surgery. Kruger married Cleveland native Jacqueline Hoyle on July 18, 2015.

References
Specific

General
 Matt Vensel (April 5, 2012).  "Ravens expect 'a heck of a year' from Paul Kruger". Baltimore Sun website. Retrieved April 5, 2012.

External links

 Utah Utes bio
 Baltimore Ravens bio
 Cleveland Browns bio

1986 births
Living people
American football defensive ends
American football outside linebackers
American Mormon missionaries in the United States
Baltimore Ravens players
Cleveland Browns players
Latter Day Saints from Utah
New Orleans Saints players
Players of American football from Utah
Sportspeople from Orem, Utah
Utah Utes football players